A wrestling singlet (or simply singlet) is a one-piece, tight-fitting, uniform, usually made of spandex/lycra, or nylon, used in wrestling. The uniform is tight-fitting so as not to get grasped accidentally by one's opponent, and allows the referee to see each wrestler's body clearly when awarding points or a pin. Unlike judo, it is illegal to grasp an opponent's clothing in all styles of amateur wrestling.

Colors
In most high school and college wrestling matches, the competitors wear singlets in their team colors. To designate a competitor's color for scoring purposes an anklet may also be worn.

In international wrestling (freestyle and Greco-Roman), wrestlers bring a red and a blue singlet (or reversible singlet) and are told before the match which color to wear.

Historically, professional wrestlers traditionally wore trunks and boots but singlets are also common among wrestlers who usually (although not always) had an amateur background such as Bret Hart, Kurt Angle and Shelton Benjamin. Many of these are much more stylized than those worn by amateurs, although the use of singlets in professional wrestling has declined in the last two decades.

Other wrestling clothing
The singlet became common in college wrestling in the late 1960s and early 1970s; in fact, it had been banned by the NCAA for years. Shirtless uniforms, including trunks and tights, were common until the NCAA banned shirtless wrestling in the mid-1960s.

A new style of singlet, known as a double or doublet, has recently emerged in college wrestling that covers more of the upper body.  Made of the same Lycra material, it is sleeve-like rather than the traditional thin-strap, open-chested singlet more commonly worn. This type of singlet is usually worn with accompanying tight-fitting shorts. It is currently only allowed on the college level, although there is report that some high school wrestlers use the style in practice sessions.

Only with special permission are wrestlers allowed to wear a t-shirt under their singlet, most commonly for sanitary reasons involving excessive acne on the chest or back.

Cuts

There are three different traditional "cuts" to wrestling singlets: the high, the FILA, and the low.

The high-cut covers much of the chest and reaches up toward the under-arms on the side.

The FILA-cut is similar, but does not rise up as high beneath the arms.

The low-cut reaches down to the middle abdomen in the front, to the hips on the sides, and features a single strap that runs up the back that is very thin. It is cooler, and some find it more comfortable.

Low-cut singlets are no longer worn at the Olympics or World Championships, which accept only a high- or FILA-cut.

See also

Amateur wrestling
Collegiate wrestling
Freestyle wrestling
Greco-Roman wrestling
Leotard
Wrestling shoes
Wrestling headgear

References

Amateur wrestling
One-piece suits
Sportswear
Martial arts uniforms
Wrestling culture